"Flying Without Wings" is a song by Irish boy band Westlife, released on 18 October 1999 as the third single from their self-titled debut studio album (1999). It is the band's fourth-best-selling single on both paid-for and combined sales in the United Kingdom as of January 2019.

Background
The song was written by Wayne Hector and Steve Mac. In an interview with HitQuarters, Hector said the basic idea for the song came to him while on a break from working on a hip hop session with Ezi Cut in Los Angeles: I came up with a couple of lines for the first verse and then phoned my mama's house, left it on the answering machine, and said, “Don't get rid of this!” Upon returning to England, Hector went into the studio to work on the idea with long-time songwriting partner and producer Steve Mac. When the two discussed what the song was about they agreed that "this is about our wives. This is about the things that make our lives complete." According to Hector the lyrics were completed in about half an hour. He added, "Flying Without Wings was a life-changing moment, and a song he says he is particularly proud of. A big moment for me was when Flying Without Wings came out, I’d had a few Number 1s at that point, but that convinced people I could write good pop songs. After that, I started working with bigger acts and over a more diverse range of genres, including country and rock, which helped me pick up some credibility." The band's manager later revealed the song had been planned as the first solo single for Boyzone's Stephen Gately. "Stephen did the demo and he thought it was going to be his song," Walsh recalls. "I'll be quite honest, I missed it, but as soon as Simon heard it he just went bananas. It was really difficult because Westlife were on tour with Boyzone, as the support act."

In a documentary aired on UTV called Westlife Back Home, band member Shane Filan said it is probably the best song of their career, while former Taoiseach Bertie Ahern (band member Nicky Byrne's father-in-law) revealed it is his favourite tune from the chart-topping band. The song also won the band their first of four Record of the Year prizes on the annual televised ITV music awards on 11 December 1999, scoring a total of 159,590 votes to beat Boyzone's Ronan Keating to the title.

The Official Charts Company stated, "Flying Without Wings wasn't the first boyband ballad, nor is it the biggest selling, but it was certainly influential. After Flying Without Wings, what self-respecting boyband would dare stay seated on a stool for a key change? Stand, boys! Flying Without Wings has soundtracked births, proposals, marriages, funerals, and untold TV talent show montages over the last two decades."

Commercial performance
The song became the group's third UK number-one single, spending 13 weeks on charts. It also received a platinum sales certification in the UK and has sold over 800,000 copies with 37 million streams there as of November 2021.

Track listings

UK and Australian CD1
 "Flying Without Wings" – 3:35
 "Everybody Knows" – 4:09
 CR-ROM

UK and Australian CD2
 "Flying Without Wings" – 3:35
 "That's What It's All About" – 3:20
 "Flying Without Wings" (a cappella mix) – 3:29

UK cassette single and European CD single
 "Flying Without Wings" – 3:35
 "Everybody Knows" – 4:09

European maxi-CD single
 "Flying Without Wings" – 3:35
 "Everybody Knows" – 3:45
 "That's What It's All About" – 3:20
 "Flying Without Wings" (a cappella mix) – 3:29
 CR-ROM

Credits and personnel
Credits are lifted from the UK CD1 and Westlife liner notes.

Studios
 Choir recorded at Avatar Studios (New York City)
 Engineered and programmed at Rokstone Studios (London, England)

Personnel

 Steve Mac – writing, all keyboards, production, mixing, arrangement, vocal arrangement
 Wayne Hector – writing, vocal arrangement
 Benny Diggs – Choir MD
 Paul Gendler – all guitars

 Steve Pearce – bass guitar
 Richard Niles – string arrangement
 Chris Laws – engineering, programming
 Matt Howe – mix engineering
 Daniel Pursey – mixing assistant

Charts

Weekly charts

Year-end charts

Certifications and sales

Duets

In 2002, as part of the promotion of their album Unbreakable: The Greatest Hits Volume 1, the song was re-recorded as a duet with Mexican singer Cristian Castro and South Korean pop singer, BoA. Each duet was included on the Spanish & Asian editions of the album. Both duets were also released as singles in their two respective regions.

Track listing
 Mexico
 "Flying Without Wings" (Duet with Cristian Castro) - 3:35
 "Never Knew I Was Losing You" - 4:09
 Asia
 "Flying Without Wings" (Duet with BoA) - 3:35
 "Never Knew I Was Losing You" - 4:09

Live version
In 2004, as part of the promotion for their Turnaround Tour, the band released the live version of the song. It was recorded during their tour in Stockholm Globe Arena. Their live version peaked at number one in UK Singles Chart and was the first ever number one in the UK downloads chart.

Track listing
 UK
 "Flying Without Wings" (Live)

Charts

Video album
A karaoke version of "Flying Without Wings" was released on DVD in 2000 and debuted at number one. It includes lyrics, photographs, and interactive menus. It has a running time of 45 minutes.

Track listing
 "Swear It Again"
 "If I Let You Go"
 "Flying Without Wings"
 "Fool Again"
 "Seasons in the Sun"
 "I Have a Dream"
 "More Than Words"
 "Against All Odds"

CD production

Other appearances
The Westlife song has appeared in the 2000 Warner Bros. Pictures film Pokémon: The Movie 2000 as the final song of the credits in the film and on the official movie soundtrack. It also featured in the 2000 Australian film The Magic Pudding and 2000 French film Archibald the Koala: The Movie. It also appeared in the Korean drama I'm Sorry, I Love You and its soundtrack as well.

On 12 May 2018, the song was performed on Korean music programme 'Immortal Songs 2' by Ali who placed second place that night. Band member Shane Filan was the featured 'Legend' and judged the participants.

In 2020, the song appeared as a music background on one of McDonald's UK and Ireland advertisements.

Ruben Studdard version

"Flying Without Wings" was covered by American Idol winner Ruben Studdard as his debut single in 2003. The single was released on 10 June and charted at number two on the Billboard Hot 100 on 28 June, behind "This Is the Night" by American Idol runner-up Clay Aiken. "Flying Without Wings" also appeared on the Hot R&B/Hip-Hop Singles & Tracks chart, peaking at number 13, and the Adult Contemporary chart, reaching number 27. The double A-side single with "Superstar" was released in Canada and New Zealand, peaking at number two in both countries, behind Aiken's release.

Charts

Weekly charts

Year-end charts

References

External links
 Official Westlife website

19 Recordings singles
1990s ballads
1999 singles
1999 songs
2003 singles
Bertelsmann Music Group singles
BoA songs
Cristian Castro songs
Delta Goodrem songs
Irish Singles Chart number-one singles
J Records singles
Pop ballads
RCA Records singles
Ruben Studdard songs
Song recordings produced by Steve Mac
Songs written by Steve Mac
Songs written by Wayne Hector
Songs written for animated films
Songs from Pokémon
Syco Music singles
UK Singles Chart number-one singles
Westlife songs